Tarmangie Hill is a hill in the Ochil Hills range, part of the Central Lowlands in Scotland. It is one of two Ochil Donalds to lie on the Clackmannanshire-Perth and Kinross border - the other being Blairdenon Hill. It is often climbed as part of a round from Glen Sherup.

Subsidiary SMC Summits

References 

Mountains and hills of Clackmannanshire
Mountains and hills of Perth and Kinross
Donald mountains